The 1971 Canadian Grand Prix was a Formula One motor race held at Mosport Park on September 19, 1971. It was race 10 of 11 in both the 1971 World Championship of Drivers and the 1971 International Cup for Formula One Manufacturers. 

During a Formula Ford preliminary race, one of the twenty drivers of the field spun at Turn 1 involving four other competitors and a group of marshals. Four of them suffered severe injuries and were taken to hospital. One lap later, Wayne Kelly, a 37‐year‐old driver from Ottawa, was killed instantly when he crashed into a stationary ambulance parked on the outside of Turn 1 whose crew was helping the injured marshals and competitors. 

The events of the Formula Ford race meant that the Grand Prix was delayed, and when it did start, it was raining and thick fog had arrived. Jackie Stewart took the win after the race was stopped after 64 laps of the scheduled 80 due to the weather. American Mark Donohue finished third on his F1 debut.

This was the first ever Formula One race to be red flagged.

Qualifying

Qualifying classification

Race

Classification

Championship standings after the race

Drivers' Championship standings

Constructors' Championship standings

Note: Only the top five positions are included for both sets of standings.

References

Canadian Grand Prix
Canadian Grand Prix
1971 in Canadian motorsport
Grand Prix